Andrieu is a name. People with the name include:

Given name
 Andrieu Contredit d'Arras ( 1200 – 1248), French poet-composer

Surname
 Bernard Andrieu (born 1959), French philosopher and historian
 Bertrand Andrieu (1761–1822), French engraver
 Éric Andrieu (born 1960), French politician
 F. Andrieu, French composer
 Julie Andrieu (born 1974), French television presenter
 Louis Andrieu ( 1920), Belgian sports shooter
 Marc Andrieu (born 1959), French rugby player
 Mathuren Arthur Andrieu (1822–1896), French painter
 Pierre Andrieu (1849–1935), French Cardinal of the Roman Catholic Church
 Pierre Andrieu (artist) (1821–1892), French painter
 René Andrieu (1920–1998), French Resistance fighter
 Nicole Courcel (1931–2016), born Nicole Andrieu, French actress

See also
 Andrieux, a surname